Anton Igorevich Kalalb (born March 16, 1988) is a Russian curler from Sochi.

Kalalb was a member of the Russian team at the 2010, 2012 and 2014 European Curling Championships. He was the alternate on the Russian team in both 2010 and 2012. At the 2010 European Curling Championships he played in all nine games for the team, which was skipped by Andrey Drozdov and finished 9th. At the 2012 European Curling Championships he would play in three games for the team, which finished fifth. At the 2014 European Curling Championships, he played lead for Evgeny Arkhipov, finishing sixth. The placement qualified the team to represent Russia at the 2015 Ford World Men's Curling Championship. At the 2015 Worlds, the Russian team finished last. Kalalb also played in the 2013 Ford World Men's Curling Championship as the alternate. He would play in two games, and the team finished in 10th.

Also in 2015, Kalalb was a member of the Russian team (skipped by Arkhipov) that won a silver medal at the 2015 Winter Universiade. He was also a member of the Russian team at the 2011 European Mixed Curling Championship, which finished 13th.

Personal life
Kalalb is married.

References

External links

Russian male curlers
Curlers from Moscow
Living people
1988 births
Universiade medalists in curling
Curlers from Saint Petersburg
Universiade silver medalists for Russia
Competitors at the 2015 Winter Universiade
Sportspeople from Sochi
Curlers at the 2022 Winter Olympics
Olympic curlers of Russia